Cedrus libani, the cedar of Lebanon or Lebanese cedar, is a species of tree in the genus cedrus, a part of the  pine family, native to the mountains of the Eastern Mediterranean basin. It is a large evergreen conifer that has great religious and historical significance in the cultures of the Middle East, and is referenced many times in the literature of ancient civilisations. It is the national emblem of Lebanon and is widely used as an ornamental tree in parks and gardens.

Description

The trunks of old trees ordinarily fork into several large, erect branches. The rough and scaly bark is dark grey to blackish brown, and is run through by deep, horizontal fissures that peel in small chips. The first-order branches are ascending in young trees; they grow to a massive size and take on a horizontal, wide-spreading disposition. Second-order branches are dense and grow in a horizontal plane. The crown is conical when young, becoming broadly tabular with age with fairly level branches; trees growing in dense forests maintain more pyramidal shapes.

Shoots and leaves
The shoots are dimorphic, with both long and short shoots. New shoots are pale brown, older shoots turn grey, grooved and scaly.

Cones
Cedrus libani produces cones beginning at around the age of 40. Its cones are borne in autumn, the male cones appear in early September and the female ones in late September. The female seed cones also grow at the terminal ends of short shoots. The young seed cones are resinous, sessile, and pale green; they require 17 to 18 months after pollination to mature. Mature cones open from top to bottom, they disintegrate and lose their seed scales, releasing the seeds until only the cone rachis remains attached to the branches.

C. libani grows rapidly until the age of 45 to 50 years; growth becomes extremely slow after the age of 70.

Taxonomy
 

Cedrus is the Latin name for true cedars. The specific epithet refers the Lebanon mountain range where the species was first described by French botanist Achille Richard; the tree is commonly known as the Lebanon cedar or cedar of Lebanon. Two distinct types are recognized as varieties: C. libani var. libani and C. libani var. brevifolia.

C. libani var. libani: Lebanon cedar, cedar of Lebanon – grows in Lebanon, western Syria, and south-central Turkey. C. libani var. stenocoma (the Taurus cedar), considered a subspecies in earlier literature, is now recognized as an ecotype of C. libani var. libani. It usually has a spreading crown that does not flatten. This distinct morphology is a habit that is assumed to cope with the competitive environment, since the tree occurs in dense stands mixed with the tall-growing Abies cilicica, or in pure stands of young cedar trees.

C. libani var. brevifolia: The Cyprus cedar occurs on the island's Troodos Mountains. This taxon was considered a separate species from C. libani because of morphological and ecophysiological trait differences. It is characterized by slow growth, shorter needles, and higher tolerance to drought and aphids. Genetic relationship studies, however, did not recognize C. brevifolia as a separate species, the markers being undistinguishable from those of C. libani.

Distribution and habitat

C. libani var. libani is endemic to elevated mountains around the Eastern Mediterranean in Lebanon, Syria, and Turkey. The tree grows in well-drained calcareous lithosols on rocky, north- and west-facing slopes and ridges and thrives in rich loam or a sandy clay in full sun.

History and symbolism
In the Epic of Gilgamesh, one of the earliest great works of literature, the Sumerian hero Gilgamesh and his friend Enkidu travel to the legendary Cedar Forest to kill its guardian and cut down its trees. While early versions of the story place the forest in Iran, later Babylonian accounts of the story place the Cedar Forest in the Lebanon.

The Lebanon cedar is mentioned several times in the Bible. Hebrew priests were ordered by Moses to use the bark of the Lebanon cedar in the treatment of leprosy. Solomon also procured cedar timber to build the Temple in Jerusalem. The Hebrew prophet Isaiah used the Lebanon cedar (together with "oaks of Bashan", "all the high mountains" and "every high tower") as examples of loftiness as a metaphor for the pride of the world and in Psalm 92:12 it says "The righteous shall flourish like the palm tree: he shall grow like a cedar in Lebanon".

National and regional significance

The Lebanon cedar is the national emblem of Lebanon, and is displayed on the flag of Lebanon and coat of arms of Lebanon. It is also the logo of Middle East Airlines, which is Lebanon's national carrier. Beyond that, it is also the main symbol of Lebanon's "Cedar Revolution" of 2005, the 2019–20 Lebanese protests, also known as Thawra (meaning revolution in Arabic) along with many Lebanese political parties and movements, such as the Lebanese Forces. Finally, Lebanon is sometimes metonymically referred to as the Land of the Cedars.

Arkansas, among other US states, has a Champion Tree program that records exceptional tree specimens. The Lebanon cedar recognized by the state is located inside Hot Springs National Park and is estimated to be over 100 years old.

Cultivation
The Lebanon cedar is widely planted as an ornamental tree in parks and gardens.

When the first cedar of Lebanon was planted in Britain is unknown, but it dates at least to 1664, when it is mentioned in Sylva, or A Discourse of Forest-Trees and the Propagation of Timber. In Britain, cedars of Lebanon are known for their use in London's Highgate Cemetery.

C. libani has gained the Royal Horticultural Society's Award of Garden Merit (confirmed 2017).

Propagation

In order to germinate Cedrus libani seeds, potting soil is preferred, since it is less likely to contain fungal species which may kill the seedling in its early stages. Before sowing it is important to soak the seed at room temperature for a period of 24 hours followed by cold stratification (~ 3–5 °C) for two to four weeks. Once the seeds have been sown, it is recommended that they be kept at room temperature (~ 20 °C) and in the vicinity of sunlight. The soil should be kept slightly damp with low frequency watering. Over-watering may cause damping off which will quickly kill the seedlings. Initial growth will be around 3–5 cm the first year and will accelerate subsequent years.

Uses
Cedar wood is prized for its fine grain, attractive yellow color, and fragrance. It is exceptionally durable and immune to insect ravages. Wood from C. libani has a density of 560 kg/m3; it is used for furniture, construction, and handicrafts. In Turkey, shelterwood cutting and clearcutting techniques are used to harvest timber and promote uniform forest regeneration. Cedar resin (cedria) and cedar essential oil (cedrum) are prized extracts from the timber and cones of the cedar tree.

Ecology and conservation
Over the centuries, extensive deforestation has occurred, with only small remnants of the original forests surviving. Attempts have been made at various times throughout history to conserve the Lebanon cedars. The first was made by the Roman emperor Hadrian; he created an imperial forest and ordered it marked by inscribed boundary stones, two of which are in the museum of the American University of Beirut.

Extensive reforestation of cedar is carried out in the Mediterranean region. Lebanese cedar populations are also expanding through an active program combining replanting and protection of natural regeneration from browsing goats, hunting, forest fires, and woodworms. The Lebanese approach emphasizes natural regeneration by creating proper growing conditions. The Lebanese state has created several reserves, including the Chouf Cedar Reserve, the Jaj Cedar Reserve, the Tannourine Reserve, the Ammouaa and Karm Shbat Reserves in the Akkar district, and the Forest of the Cedars of God near Bsharri.

Because during the seedling stage, differentiating C. libani from C. atlantica or C. deodara is difficult, the American University of Beirut has developed a DNA-based method of identification to ensure that reforestation efforts in Lebanon are of the cedars of Lebanon and not other types.

Diseases and pests
C. libani is susceptible to a number of soil-borne, foliar, and stem pathogens. The seedlings are prone to fungal attacks. Botrytis cinerea, a necrotrophic fungus known to cause considerable damage to food crops, attacks the cedar needles, causing them to turn yellow and drop. Armillaria mellea (commonly known as honey fungus) is a basidiomycete that fruits in dense clusters at the base of trunks or stumps and attacks the roots of cedars growing in wet soils. The Lebanese cedar shoot moth (Parasyndemis cedricola) is a species of moth of the family Tortricidae found in the forests of Lebanon and Turkey; its larvae feed on young cedar leaves and buds.

Gallery

See also
Cedar Forest – Lebanon cedar forest that was home to the gods in Ancient Mesopotamian religion
Cedars of God – an old-growth C. libani forest and World Heritage Site
List of plants known as cedar

References

Bibliography

External links

Cedrus libani – information, genetic conservation units and related resources. European Forest Genetic Resources Programme (EUFORGEN)

libani
Flora of North Africa
Flora of Western Asia
Flora of Lebanon
Flora of Morocco
Forest history
Locations in Mesopotamian mythology
Epic of Gilgamesh
National symbols of Lebanon
Vulnerable flora of Africa
Vulnerable flora of Asia
Garden plants of Asia
Drought-tolerant trees
Plants used in bonsai
Ornamental trees
Natural history of Anatolia